Gambell Airport  is a public airport located in Gambell, a city in the Nome Census Area of the U.S. state of Alaska. The airport is owned by the state.

Facilities

Airlines and destinations 

Prior to its bankruptcy and cessation of all operations, Ravn Alaska served the airport from multiple locations.

History
Gambell Airport was used as a transport base during World War II as Gambell Army Airfield, facilitating the transit of Lend-Lease aircraft to the Soviet Union.  It was also used by the USAAF as an emergency landing field for aircraft patrolling the west coast of Alaska.

On 27 February 1974, a Soviet Union An-24LR carrying a crew of three and ten scientists on an ice-reconnaissance mission landed at Gambell due to fuel exhaustion in bad weather, causing a minor Cold War incident. Villagers, mostly Yupik Native Americans, provided space heaters and food. A U.S. Air Force C-130 flew in a load of fuel bladders with JP-1 fuel from Anchorage to refuel the An-24, which departed at 7:30 pm. She dipped her wings in salute in a pass over the airfield, then returned to Soviet airspace.

On 30 August 1975, Wien Air Alaska Flight 99, a Fairchild F-27B on approach to landing, crashed into Sevuokuk Mountain after multiple missed approaches, killing the pilot and co-pilot and eight others out of the 32 crew and passengers on board. The weather was a low ceiling with sea fog, and below approach minimums.

References

External links
 FAA Alaska airport diagram (GIF)

Airports in the Nome Census Area, Alaska
St. Lawrence Island